The 2022 Fanatec GT World Challenge America Powered by AWS was the sixteenth season of the United States Auto Club's GT World Challenge America, and the fifth under ownership of SRO Motorsports Group.The season began at Sonoma Raceway on April 15, and ended at Indianapolis Motor Speedway on October 8.

K-PAX Racing and Andrea Caldarelli won the Pro category Teams' and Drivers' Championships for the second consecutive year, as Lamborghini won the Manufacturers' Championship. Racers Edge Motorsports, Mario Farnbacher, and Ashton Harrison won the Pro/Am Championships, as Harrison became the first woman to win a series championship in any category of GT World Challenge America. Triarsi Competizione, Onofrio Triarsi, and Charlie Scardina won the Am Championships as the only team in the category to participate in every round.

Calendar
The preliminary calendar was released on September 4, 2021, without disclosing the location of round two. On October 10, 2021, the SRO announced that Ozarks International Raceway would fill the vacancy in the schedule, pending FIA circuit homologation. The round at Virginia International Raceway was also postponed one week to avoid a clash with the 2022 24 Hours of Le Mans.

On April 27, 2022, the SRO announced that the second round at Ozarks was relocated to NOLA Motorsports Park, due to the challenges related with infrastructure and supply chain.

The Indianapolis 8 Hours once again served as the final round of the GT World Challenge America season. However, unlike the 2021 race where points were paid after three hours of racing to eligible teams, championship points would be paid at the end of the eight-hour distance.

Entry list

Mid-season changes

 On May 10, the Pro category requirements were updated to require one Silver graded driver on every eligible team, beginning from the second race meeting at NOLA Motorsports Park. This forced the following changes within the line-ups at Lamborghini Squadra Corse teams:
 The 2021 Pro Championship winning lineup of Andrea Caldarelli and Jordan Pepper were separated, with Pepper moving to the #3 K-PAX Racing entry to join Misha Goikhberg.
 Giacomo Altoè moved from the #3 K-PAX Racing team to Pro/Am team TR3 Racing, alongside Ziad Ghandour for the NOLA and VIR rounds.
 Michele Beretta moved from TR3 Racing into the #1 K-PAX Racing entry to join Caldarelli.

 K-PAX Racing's #3 car and Turner Motorsport were moved from Pro/Am to Pro prior to the start of the first race at Sonoma Raceway, following a review of Misha Goikhberg and Michael Dinan's driver rating derogations.
 Jean-Claude Saada, Conrad Grunewald, and the #61 AF Corse entry did not race after an accident in the first race at VIR. Grunewald would later join Triarsi Competizione for the Indianapolis 8 Hours, driving their #13 Ferrari 488 GT3.
 Jeff Burton and Corey Lewis joined TR3 Racing from Zelus Motorsports at Road America, replacing Ghandour and Altoè in their Lamborghini Huracán GT3.
 Team Hardpoint entered Watkins Glen as a one-off entry with drivers PJ Hyett and Gunnar Jeannette driving a Porsche 911 GT3-R. An incident for Hyett in GT America race two forced them to withdraw from that afternoon's GT World Challenge America race.
 GMG Racing entered Road America with a Porsche 911 GT3-R for James Sofronas and Kyle Washington.
 Zelus Motorsports did not enter Road America and Sebring. Madison Snow did not rejoin the team when they returned for the Indianapolis 8 Hours.
 Conquest Racing joined the series from Sebring. They were moved from Pro/Am to Pro prior to the start of the first race, following a review of Manny Franco's driver rating derogation.
 Andretti Autosport x Vital Speed and Cameron Racing joined the series at the Indianapolis 8 Hours.
 For the Indianapolis 8 Hours, DXDT Racing moved both of their cars out of Pro/Am, and entered their #63 Mercedes-AMG GT3 into the Pro category, and their #08 car into the Am category. Triarsi Competizione's #23 Ferrari was moved from Am to Pro/Am. GMG Racing's #32 Porsche also moved from Am to Pro/Am, while Zelus Motorsports moved their #88 Lamborghini from Pro/Am to Am. ST Racing moved their #38 BMW from Pro/Am to be the only Silver Cup entry in the race.

Race results
Bold indicates overall winner.

Championship standings
Scoring system
Championship points are awarded for the first ten positions in each race. Entries are required to complete 75% of the winning car's race distance in order to be classified and earn points. Individual drivers are required to participate for a minimum of 40 minutes in order to earn championship points in any race. Race-by-race entries which only participated in either of the final two races of the season are not eligible for points.

Standard Points

Indianapolis Points

Drivers' championship

Notes
  – Drivers did not finish the race but were classified, as they completed more than 75% of the race distance.

Teams' championship

See also
 2022 British GT Championship
 2022 GT World Challenge Europe
 2022 GT World Challenge Europe Endurance Cup
 2022 GT World Challenge Europe Sprint Cup
 2022 GT World Challenge Asia
 2022 GT World Challenge Australia
 2022 Intercontinental GT Challenge

References

External links

GT World Challenge America
GT_World_Challenge_America
2022 GT World Challenge America